The Auburndale Citrus Growers Association Packing House (also known as the Exchange Packing House or Adams Packing Co. Cold Storage Facility) is a historic site in Auburndale, Florida. It is located at 214 Orange Street. On July 17, 1997, it was added to the U.S. National Register of Historic Places.

References

External links
 Polk County listings at National Register of Historic Places

Citrus industry in Florida
National Register of Historic Places in Polk County, Florida
Auburndale, Florida